Georgetown is a city in Quitman County, Georgia, United States. It is on the Alabama-Georgia state line next to Walter F. George Lake and across the Chattahoochee River from Eufaula, Alabama. Per the 2020 census, the population was 2,235. In 2006, Georgetown and Quitman County voted to  consolidate their governments, becoming the smallest such consolidated entity in the Lower 48 states.

History 
Settled in the early 1830s, Georgetown was first named Tobanana for the nearby creek. The Tobanana Post Office was established on January 10, 1833. On September 21, 1836, the name of the town was changed to "Georgetown" after the historic neighborhood in Washington, D.C.

Georgetown was designated in 1859 as the county seat of Quitman County and was laid out as a town by order of the Inferior Court. The town was incorporated by an act of the legislature on December 9, 1859.

A brigade of federal cavalry, commanded by General Benjamin H. Grierson, camped for a time near Georgetown on the banks of the Tobanana Creek at the close of the American Civil War.

Georgetown was destroyed by fire in 1903; every building except for the post office and three houses were destroyed.

Geography

U.S. Route 82, as well as Georgia State Routes 27 and 39, are the main highways through the city. U.S. 82 runs west-east through the city as Middle Street, leading west  to Eufaula, Alabama across the Chattahoochee River and southeast  to Cuthbert. GA-39 runs north-south through the city briefly concurrent with U.S. 82, leading north  to Omaha and south  to Fort Gaines. GA-27 begins in the city and leads northeast  to Lumpkin.

Demographics

2020 census

Note: the US Census treats Hispanic/Latino as an ethnic category. This table excludes Latinos from the racial categories and assigns them to a separate category. Hispanics/Latinos can be of any race.

2000 Census
As of the census of 2000, there were 973 people, 367 households, and 274 families residing in the city. The racial makeup of the city was 60.02% African American,  39.77% White, 0.10% Asian, and 0.10% from two or more races.

There were 367 households, out of which 29.4% had children under the age of 18 living with them, 44.4% were married couples living together, 26.2% had a female householder with no husband present, and 25.3% were non-families. 22.6% of all households were made up of individuals, and 13.6% had someone living alone who was 65 years of age or older.  The average household size was 2.65 and the average family size was 3.11.

In the city, the population was spread out, with 27.6% under the age of 18, 7.0% from 18 to 24, 25.2% from 25 to 44, 20.1% from 45 to 64, and 20.0% who were 65 years of age or older.  The median age was 38 years. For every 100 females, there were 83.2 males.  For every 100 females age 18 and over, there were 75.1 males.

The median income for a household in the city was $22,941, and the median income for a family was $25,250. Males had a median income of $22,404 versus $20,000 for females. The per capita income for the city was $11,407.  About 22.0% of families and 25.9% of the population were below the poverty line, including 25.9% of those under age 18 and 30.4% of those age 65 or over.

Education 
The Quitman County School District holds grades pre-school to grade twelve. It consists of one elementary-middle school, and one high school that consists of grades ninth through twelfth. The district has 22 full-time teachers and over 314 students.

County students attended Stewart-Quitman High School (now Stewart County High School) from 1978, until Quitman County High opened, in 2009.

Gallery

References

External links
 Official website of Georgetown -Quitman County

Cities in Georgia (U.S. state)
Cities in Quitman County, Georgia
County seats in Georgia (U.S. state)
Georgia populated places on the Chattahoochee River
Consolidated city-counties